Bembe (Kibembe or Ebembe) is a Bantu language of the Democratic Republic of the Congo and Western Tanzania. According to Ethnologue, it forms a dialect continuum with the Lega language through Mwenga Lega.

References

Lega-Binja languages